Étienne Chicot (5 May 1949 – 7 August 2018) was a French actor and composer.

Filmography

Theatre

References

External links 

French male film actors
1949 births
2018 deaths
20th-century French male actors
21st-century French male actors
French male stage actors
French male television actors
People from Fécamp